The Antioquia wren (Thryophilus sernai) is a passerine from the wren family (Troglodytidae). It was discovered in March 2010 in the vicinity of the Cauca River in Antioquia, Colombia and described as a new species by Lara et al (2012). The epithet commemorates the late Marco Antonio Serna Díaz (1936–1991), a Colombian naturalist from San Vicente Ferrer, Antioquia.

The Antioquia wren is closely related to the rufous-and-white wren and the Niceforo's wren. It occurs on both banks of the Cauca River Canyon but it is uncommon throughout its range. Its habitat is dry forests.

Principal threats to the species include habitat destruction caused by the building of the Ituango Dam.

References

Lara, C. E., A. M. Cuervo, S. V. Valderrama, D. Calderón-F. & C. D. Cadena. (2012). "A new species of wren (Troglodytidae: Thryophilus) from the dry Cauca River Canyon, northwestern Colombia". The Auk 129 (3): 537–550.

External links
Videos, photos and sounds – Internet Bird Collection
Video on a singing male – Flickr
Proposal: Recognize newly described Thryophilus sernai – South American Classification Committee

Antioquia wren
Birds of the Colombian Andes
Endemic birds of Colombia
Antioquia wren